The 1911 Norwegian Football Cup was the tenth season of the Norwegian annual knockout football tournament. The tournament was open for 1911 local association leagues (kretsserier) champions, and the defending champion, Lyn. Lyn won their fourth consecutive title, having beaten Urædd in the final.

First round

|colspan="3" style="background-color:#97DEFF"|3 September 1911

|}

The rest of the teams had a walkover.

Second round

|colspan="3" style="background-color:#97DEFF"|19 September 1911

|}

Semi-finals

|colspan="3" style="background-color:#97DEFF"|1 October 1911

|}

Final

See also
1911 in Norwegian football

References

Norwegian Football Cup seasons
Norway
Football Cup